Henry Bremeler (fl. 1407–1411) was an English politician.

He was a Member (MP) of the Parliament of England for Dartmouth in 1407 and for Totnes in 1411.

References

Year of birth missing
Year of death missing
English MPs 1407
English MPs 1411
Members of the Parliament of England (pre-1707) for Totnes
Members of the Parliament of England for Dartmouth